Christian courtship, also known as Biblical courtship, is the traditional Christian practice of individuals in approaching "the prospect of marriage". Preceded by a proposal, courtship traditionally begins after a betrothal and concludes with the celebration of marriage (though in the present-day, courtship may precede the betrothal, which is then followed by the wedding). Christian theologian John Piper distinguished courtship from dating, teaching that:

Andre Marie, a brother of the Slaves of the Immaculate Heart of Mary, discusses that courtship allows a couple to become acquainted with one another, and that physical intimacy is saved only for those in wedlock. Christian minister Patricia Bootsma further delineates this distinction, writing that in contrast to the modern conception of dating, in "courtship, time together in groups with family or friends is encouraged, and there is oversight by and accountability to parents or mentors". She further states that with courtship, "commitment happens before intimacy". 

Christian courtship remains normative in certain Christian countries such as Guatemala, in which much of the population belongs to the Roman Catholic Church. In the United States, courtship is seen as a response to secular dating culture in which various Christian communities might find themselves, c. 1985 to present. Motivated by concern for the need of Christian values in contrast to secular dating practices, conservative Christians identified what they saw as key Biblical principles for courtship and romance, and began to disseminate them in the 1980s.

The practice of traditional Christian courtship among church members belonging to various Christian denominations experienced a revival in the 1980s. Keynote speaker and author Dr. S.M. Davis developed a unique stand on this philosophy, and his materials have been popular with the homeschool culture since the early 1990s. Proponents of courtship say that it is identified by Biblical principles, rather than particular methods or behavioural practices. These principles have been summarized in Leave Dating Behind: a Road Map to Marriage by Christina Rogers within the acronym CARE:
Commitment to marriage
Accountability 
Rejection of the secular dating philosophy
Establishing physical boundaries (Song of Songs 2:7)

Characteristics of traditional Christian courtship 
 The guardianship responsibility of fathers over single daughters.
 The responsibility of parents to prepare their children for marriage in all respects, and for youths to be prepared in terms of talents, education, vocation and finances prior to seeking a courtship relationship.
 The mentoring role of parents or other suitable "accountability couples" in a given courtship.
 Supervision of courtships to mitigate temptations or abuse, whether of a sexual, emotional or financial nature.
 Emphasis of the importance of marriage as an opportunity for Christian service rather than a selfish endeavor.
 Emphasis of the importance of singleness before marriage as a time for greater Christian service in the community, rather than a time to be employed in selfish pursuits.
 Emphasis of the importance of counsel and evaluation by family and friends as a relationship progresses. (Song of Songs 1:4)
 Emphasis of the importance of honesty and getting to know one another as real people in "normal life" during courtship (as contrasted with the dating habit of meeting during special events and entertainment while on one's best behavior.)
 The maintenance of sexual purity in accordance with the evangelical counsel of chastity.

See also 

 Espousals of the Blessed Virgin Mary
 Quiverfull
 When God Writes Your Love Story by Eric Ludy and Leslie Ludy

References

External links 
Stages Of A Traditional Catholic Courtship
Dr. SM Davis and Solve Family Problems
Before The Kiss Testimonies of couples who have participated in some form of courtship model.

Intimate relationships
Christian movements
Sexuality in Christianity